John Frawley (born 4 July 1965) is an Australian retired tennis player. He reached a career-high singles ranking of World No. 35 in January 1988.

He is the younger brother of Rod Frawley.

Tennis career

Juniors
As a junior, Frawley reached the final of Wimbledon in 1983 (losing to Stefan Edberg) and won both the Wimbledon and French Open junior doubles titles with Pat Cash in 1982.

Pro tour
Frawley twice reached the fourth round of the Australian Open, defeating seeds Mike Bauer and Peter Lundgren en route.

References

External links
 
 

Australian male tennis players
French Open junior champions
Wimbledon junior champions
1965 births
Living people
Tennis people from Queensland
Grand Slam (tennis) champions in boys' doubles
20th-century Australian people
21st-century Australian people